The Connecticut Department of Energy and Environmental Protection (DEEP) is a state agency in the US state of Connecticut. The department oversees the state's natural resources and environment and regulates public utilities and energy policy. It is headquartered in Hartford.

The agency was created on July 1, 2011, by the merging of two other state agencies, the Connecticut Department of Environmental Protection and the Connecticut Department of Public Utility Control. Daniel C. Esty was appointed as commissioner of the DEEP upon its creation in July 2011. Rob Klee served as commissioner of the department from January 2014 through December 2018. Katie S. Dykes has served as commissioner since January 2019.

The law enforcement branch of DEEP is the Connecticut State Environmental Conservation Police. Officers were previously known as game wardens.

See also
 Climate change in Connecticut

References

External links
 
 Official Connecticut DEEP Hunting Regulations
 Official Connecticut DEEP Inland & Marine Fishing Regulations

State agencies of Connecticut
Environment of Connecticut
State environmental protection agencies of the United States
2011 establishments in Connecticut
Government agencies established in 2011
Connecticut